Reader Rabbit's Ready for Letters is a 1992 video game and the fifth game of the Reader Rabbit franchise. Although a spin-off title, it is designed for ages 3 to 6 to teach prereaders about becoming literate and phonics.

Educational goals
The game was designed with a re-usability value, which help children develop new language skills and sharpen old ones. The game allows for free exploration and offers activities that enable children to begin learning to read. The modules included teach shape recognition, matching and basic word skills. The digitized voices encourage direction, exercises listening comprehension and helps tie language to words. The concept of cause-and-effect is implemented. The activities expose prereaders to letters, simple words, word relationships, creativity, colors, shapes and matching. Music and animations add to retain interest.

Gameplay
The game takes place in the house and garden of Grandma and Grandpa Rabbit. There are two modes during gameplay; the free-form mode, which allows players to do the activities are in their own way and the goal-based mode, which instructs the player what to do. The game consists of six activities:

 The Music Pond
 Grandma's Kitchen
 The Mix-and-Match Bedroom
 The ABC Bathroom
 The Picture Parlor
 Grandpa's Workshop

Reception

The Managing Editor of PCM Magazine Sue Fomby highlighted the game for its gameplay that helped children to start reading. MacUser gave the game 2 and a half stars, being suited for the youngest and lesser experienced prereaders. The game was reviewed in the Oppenheim Toy Portfolio Guide Book where it was praised for its "snappy and colorful" graphics.

References

External links
 

1992 video games
DOS games
Classic Mac OS games
Reader Rabbit
The Learning Company games
Children's educational video games
Video games developed in the United States
Single-player video games